The Tucson Sugar Skulls are a professional indoor American football team based in Tucson, Arizona.  They are members of the Indoor Football League (IFL) since the 2019 season as an expansion team. They play home games at Tucson Convention Center's Tucson Arena.  The team are led by owners Cathy Guy, wife of Arizona Rattlers' head coach Kevin Guy, and Ali Farhang. Their head coach is former IFL player Dixie Wooten.

History
The franchise was announced by the ownership group led by Kevin and Cathy Guy at a press conference held on August 23, 2018, at the Tucson Convention Center. As Kevin Guy was also the head coach of the Arizona Rattlers, Cathy was named the majority owner of the Tucson team to oversee primary operations along with Mike Feder and Ali Farhang. The team announced Marcus Coleman as its first head coach on September 12, 2018. The team name was revealed on September 20, 2018, after a name-the-team contest originating from the local tradition of creating sugar skulls for Día de Muertos (Day of the Dead) and the Roman Catholic holiday of All Souls Day.

The team qualified for the playoffs in their first season with a 7–7 record. They lost to the eventual league champion Sioux Falls Storm 50–47 in the first round. After the season, the Sugar Skulls hired two-time IFL coach of the year Dixie Wooten away from the Iowa Barnstormers as head coach and general manager for the 2020 season. However, the season was cancelled due to the COVID-19 pandemic before the Sugar Skulls played any games.

Personnel

Current roster

Staff

Statistics

Season-by-season results

Head coaches
Note: Statistics are correct through the 2021 IFL season.

References

External links
 

American football teams in Arizona
Indoor Football League teams
American football teams established in 2018
2018 establishments in Arizona